Miss Earth 2009, the 9th edition of the Miss Earth pageant, was held on November 22, 2009 at the Boracay Ecovillage Resort and Convention Center in Boracay, Malay, Aklan, Philippines. Karla Henry of Philippines crowned her successor Larissa Ramos of Brazil at the end of the event.

The pageant had 80 delegates from various countries and territories that vied for the Miss Earth crown. The pageant's Top 16 competed on both swimsuit and evening gown competitions to determine the Top 8, the first time since 2003.

The Miss Earth 2009 theme was "Green Lifestyle", in which the candidates were involved with environmental causes. The show was hosted by Marc Nelson, Sarah Meier, and Borgy Manotoc.

Results

Placements

Special awards

Major awards

Minor/Sponsor awards

Order of Announcements

Top 16
Poland
Korea
Brazil
Colombia
Thailand
Spain
Northern Ireland
Philippines
South Africa
France
Singapore
Georgia
Martinique
India
Venezuela
Paraguay

Top 8
Thailand
Brazil
Poland
Martinique
Spain
Venezuela
Philippines
Colombia

Winning answer
For the 9th edition of Miss Earth, no single final question was asked. Instead, images were flashed on screen and each of the eight finalists were tasked to tell something about it.

Statement of Miss Earth 2009: "I come from a country that has the largest rainforest in the world, and it is also known as the 'lungs of the world'. But we cannot just say that we are the 'lungs of the world' because my country produces a lot of air pollution as well." – Larissa Ramos, represented Brazil.

Judges

Preliminary events

Beauties for a Cause
The delegates of Miss Earth 2009 visited different islands of the Philippines with the theme "Green Lifestyle" and promoted the use of recyclable materials as part of a collective lifestyle. In addition, they engaged in different environmental activities including the planting of trees, and had school tours in the provinces of Ilocos, Laguna, Negros Occidental, Albay, Pampanga, Bulacan, Rizal, Pangasinan, Batangas, Iloilo, and Metro Manila.

Press Presentation
On 4 November 2009, the delegates were presented to the local and international media at Mader's Garden in Pasig. The women shared their environmental campaigns and expressed their cause on Mother Nature, a continuous campaign they have been waging as "Beauties for a Cause".

Press presentation photos

National Costume
The National costume competition of Miss Earth 2009 was held on 4 November 2009 at the Cultural Center of the Philippines Grand Theater in Pasay.

Eighty delegates participated in the competition, with Miss Tanzania winning the Best in National Costume award. Minor/sponsor awards were also given that night which included the Placenta Award which was given to Miss Puerto Rico and Pasigandahan Award (the award name is a combination of the main river that passes through Manila and the Filipino word for beauty) which went to Miss Guam.

Evening Gown competition
The delegates were divided into three groups which simultaneously competed in the evening gown preliminary competition in three different locations:
 (Group 1) On 8 November, Splash Mountain Resort Hotel in Los Baños, Laguna. The finalists:
 
 
 
 
 
 (Group 2) On 9 November, Greenbelt 5 of Ayala. The finalists:
 
 
 
 
 
 (Group 3) On 7 November, Subic Bay Yacht Club in Subic. The finalists:

Swimsuit competition
The delegates were divided into three groups which simultaneously competed in the swimsuit competition in three different locations:
 (Group 1) On 7 November, Golden Sunset Resort in Calatagan, Batangas. The finalists:
 
 
 
 
 
 (Group 2) On 12 November, Legazpi City, Bicol Region. The finalists:
 
 
 
 
 
 (Group 3) On 8 November, Central Country Estate, Inc. The Lakeshore. The finalists:

Mall tours
The delegates also had their mall tours and fashion shows in all Robinsons Malls nationwide in order to promote the cause of protection of the environment.

TV shows
Selected ladies appeared as guests on one of the TV shows of ABS-CBN, the official media partner of Carousel Production for Miss Earth 2009. They had gone to Showtime, ASAP 09, The Singing Bee.

Coronation venue
For the first time, the pageant did not take place on the Island of Luzon. The venue for Miss Earth 2009 final night was first planned to be in Cebu City, but the mayor declined due to the financial cost of sponsoring the pageant. Boracay Ecovillage Resort and Convention Center won the rights to host the coronation night of the 2009 edition of the pageant.

New crown
The Miss Earth organizers unveiled a new crown to be worn by the winner of Miss Earth 2009, with the preservation of planet Earth as its primary consideration. The crown was designed by an environmentalist jewelry designer from Florida, Ramona Haar, the official jeweller of the Miss Earth pageant.

The new crown is made of 100% recycled precious metals: 14kt gold and argentums sterling silver. The gemstones used were precious and semiprecious stones and donations from over 80 participating countries. These are gemstones that each country is known for either as the origin or source. The gemstones were sent in various forms: faceted, cabochons, beads or rough. The designer travelled to Jaipur, India to have these gemstones individually trim and faceted to the required cut and sizes.

The flower in the center of the crown represents Mother Earth, as inspired by the statement of the American poet, Ralph Waldo Emerson's "The earth laughs in flowers". The recurring spiral motif has always been associated with "maternal power" and "feminine prestige" which is the essence of Miss Earth. The gentle curves in the crown symbolize "unity" and the "spirit of cooperation".

Contestants

Notes

Debuts

Returns

Last competed in 2006:
 
 
Last competed in 2007:

Withdrawals
Contestants who were confirmed initially but were deleted from the roster of delegates just before the pageant started:
  – Amada Hernandez
  – Aure Arnulf
  – Esther Sitali Banda

Contestant who were confirmed initially but were deleted from the roster of delegates six days after the pageant started:

  – Dominique Peltier
  – Lejla Adrovic
  – Vinka Groseta
  – Genet Denoba Ogeto
  – Inessa Nazarova
  – Queen Christie Tembo
  – Roxana Ilie

Contestants who withdrew due to other reasons:
  – Tumisang Sebina was disqualified due to height requirements.
  – Maritza Rivas was supposedly to compete at Miss Earth but was unable to due to visa problems.
  – Trương Thị May suffered from a serious sprain on her left leg after a fall on 24 October, just 7 days before the pageant started. She appeared as a special guest in the grand final. It was planned that she might return the following year, but it did not happen. She was a featured candidate represent Vietnam at Miss Earth 2011 after so many unlucky times.

Countries who withdrew due to lack of funding and sponsorship:

Other notes
  – Alejandra Mendoza, the winner of Miss Honduras Belleza Nacional 2007–2008 (Miss Honduras 2007–2008) pageant, was supposed to represent Honduras in the Miss Earth 2008, but failed to compete. She competed in the Miss Earth 2009.
  – Sandra Seifert was a contestant in Binibining Pilipinas 2009, but was disqualified for having posed in a two-piece-swimsuit in a men's magazine. Born in Taiwan, she is the first non-native born Philippine representative. Seifert's father is of German heritage, and her mother is Filipino.
  – Amy Diaz previously competed in the Miss USA 2008 where she made the top 15. Diaz is also half Dominican.

References

External links

 
 Miss Earth contestants
 Woman of the Earth
 Miss Earth Foundation website

2009
2009 beauty pageants
2009 in the Philippines
Beauty pageants in the Philippines